Wendy Morton (born 9 November 1967) is a British politician who served as Chief Whip of the House of Commons and Parliamentary Secretary to the Treasury from September to October 2022. A member of the Conservative Party, she has been the Member of Parliament (MP) for Aldridge-Brownhills in the West Midlands since 2015.

Morton served as an Assistant Government Whip under Theresa May from 2018 to 2019. After Boris Johnson became Prime Minister in July 2019, Morton was appointed Parliamentary Under-Secretary of State for Justice. In the February 2020 reshuffle, she was appointed Parliamentary Under-Secretary of State for European Neighbourhood and the Americas. In December 2021, she was appointed Parliamentary Under-Secretary of State for Transport; she was promoted to Minister of State in February 2022. After Johnson resigned in July 2022, Morton supported Liz Truss’s bid to become Conservative leader. Following Truss's appointment as Prime Minister, she appointed Morton as Chief Whip of the Conservative Party, however did not retain the position when Rishi Sunak was appointed Prime Minister in October 2022.

Early life and career
Morton was born in 1967 in Northallerton, Yorkshire, England. She was educated at The Wensleydale School, a comprehensive school in Leyburn, North Yorkshire. She later gained an MBA with the Open University.

Her career began as an executive officer in HM Diplomatic Service at the Foreign and Commonwealth Office between 1987 and 1989. She then worked in business, sales, and marketing. She set up an electronics company, with her husband, designing and manufacturing electronic goods for the agricultural industry.

Parliamentary career

Early parliamentary career
Morton contested the Newcastle upon Tyne Central constituency in 2005, where she placed third. She was selected to fight the Tynemouth constituency in 2010, as it was the top Conservative Party target that cycle. Morton would go on to be defeated by Labour's Alan Campbell. Following her defeat, she contested a North Tyneside Council by-election for the Battle Hill ward in September 2010, where she came in third place.

In October 2014, Morton attempted to be selected as the Conservative candidate for Richmond in North Yorkshire, but she was defeated by Rishi Sunak, the future Prime Minister. After her defeat in Richmond (Yorks), Morton attempted to be selected as the Conservative candidate in several other seats, before she was eventually selected for the Aldridge-Brownhills seat in January 2015. Morton won the seat in May with 52% of the vote. She made her maiden speech on 3 June 2015. During the 57th Parliament, Morton sat on the International Development Select Committee. She was also the Chair of the APPG for Sustainable Development Goals, as well as taking an active interest in several other APPG's.

Her first Private Members bill, NHS (Charitable Trusts, etc.) Bill, received Royal assent on 23 March 2016 and is now law. Her Second Private Member's Bill the Local Audit (Public Access to Documents) bill received Royal Assent on 27 April 2017.

Morton was opposed to Brexit prior to the 2016 referendum, but subsequently voted in favour.

Morton supported Theresa May in the 2016 Conservative Party leadership election. In the summer of 2016, she was appointed a Parliamentary Private Secretary at the newly created Department for Business, Energy and Industrial Strategy.

57th Parliament 

At the 2017 general election, Morton stood for reelection and increased her majority to 14,307 and gained 65.4% of the vote. In the government reshuffle following the election Morton was promoted to Parliamentary Private Secretary to Secretary of State for International Development Priti Patel at the Department for International Development.

She was made an assistant government whip during the reshuffle on 9 January 2018.

After Boris Johnson won the 2019 Conservative Party leadership election, Morton said that Johnson would bring "real energy, vision and determination" to the role of Prime Minister and said: "Now he must get on and deliver Brexit, and importantly get it done by October 31".

She became a Parliamentary Under-Secretary of State for the Ministry of Justice in the Johnson ministry on 26 July 2019.

58th Parliament 
Morton stood for reelection at the December 2019 election. Morton increased her majority, obtaining 27,850 votes, which was 70.8% of the vote.

In February 2020 as Minister for Victims, Morton pledged an increase in government funding for rape support services.

In the 2020 cabinet reshuffle, Morton was promoted to Parliamentary Under-Secretary of State for European Neighbourhood and the Americas at the Foreign and Commonwealth Office. She was reshuffled to the Department for Transport on 19 December 2021, following the move of responsibility for the United Kingdom's relationship with the European Union to the Foreign, Commonwealth and Development Office, in a straight job-swap with Chris Heaton-Harris.

Morton endorsed Liz Truss during the July–September 2022 Conservative Party leadership election.

She was sworn in as a member of the Privy Council on 13 September 2022. The same day she was the recipient of alleged abusive texts from MP Sir Gavin Williamson over his exclusion from the guest list of the funeral of Queen Elizabeth II at Westminster Abbey. During a further text exchange on 17 October, she wrote, "I need no lecture from you Gavin when I ask a civil question."

On 19 October, during an ongoing political crisis, Morton was reported to have resigned as Chief Whip during a Commons vote and then un-resigned later that evening. She later confirmed that she had resigned, but Truss rejected her resignation and she instead continued as Chief Whip. On 24 October, Morton submitted a formal complaint to Conservative Campaign Headquarters over Williamson's text messages.

Morton resigned as Chief Whip shortly after the resignation of Truss as prime minister on 25 October 2022. On 26 October, following Williamson's promotion to Cabinet, Morton escalated her complaint by flagging and supplying the offending texts to the Cabinet Office's Proprietary and Ethics Team. Morton asked for anonymity but the text content was leaked to the Sunday Times and also appeared in the Telegraph and Metro on 7 November 2022. On 8 November, Sky News reported that Morton has lodged a complaint with the Parliamentary watchdog, Independent Complaints and Grievance Scheme, regarding the content of the text messages that she had previously reported identical allegations to her party executive as abusive.

Notes

References

Further reading

External links

 Personal website
 
 

|-

|-

|-

1967 births
Conservative Party (UK) MPs for English constituencies
Female members of the Parliament of the United Kingdom for English constituencies
Living people
People from North Yorkshire
People from Aldridge
People from Brownhills
Place of birth missing (living people)
UK MPs 2015–2017
UK MPs 2017–2019
UK MPs 2019–present
21st-century British women politicians
Female justice ministers
British businesspeople in retailing
21st-century English women
21st-century English people
Members of the Privy Council of the United Kingdom